Marine Monnet-Melocco (born 1978) is a French professional golfer who played on the Ladies European Tour and LPGA Tour. She won The Womens Amateur in 1999 and finished third on the LET Order of Merit in 2000.

Amateur career
Monnet won the 1996 Girls Amateur Championship, the 1999 European Ladies' Team Championship for France, and the 1999 Vagliano Trophy representing the Continent of Europe. The same year she crowned her amateur career by winning The Womens Amateur Championship against England's Rebecca Hudson.

Professional career

Ladies European Tour
Monnet turned professional in the end of 1999 and joined the Ladies European Tour in 2000. She almost secured a win in her first season. At the Ladies Irish Open she had a four stroke lead after the penultimate round, but after a final round of 74 she had to settle for runner-up, one stroke behind Sophie Gustafson. This was the closest Monnet ever came to a LET victory, over her six LET seasons she finished third eight times; at the Marrakech Palmeraie Open, Ladies Hannover Expo 2000 Open, Kronenbourg 1664 Chart Hills Classic, P4 Norwegian Masters, Arras Open de France Dames, Tenerife Ladies Open, KLM Ladies Open and the Open de España Femenino. While a win proved elusive, her many top-10 positions helped her do well in the Order of Merit, finishing third in 2000, fourth in 2001, and seventh in 2002.

In 2001, she won the Lalla Meryem Cup when it was still a non-LET invitational event.

Her best result in an LET Major was a fourth place at the 2001 Evian Masters, an event co-sanctioned by the LPGA Tour.

At the 2003 Women's Australian Open, she shot seven consecutive birdies, a LET record.

Monnet shot her career first hole-in-one at the 2005 Samsung Ladies Masters in Singapore, and won a car.

LPGA Tour
In March 2002, Monnet and Lorena Ochoa, then a sophomore at the University of Arizona, received the two sponsor's invites to play the PING Banner Health at Moon Valley Country Club in Phoenix, Arizona. In October 2002 Monnet earned exempt status on the LPGA Tour by finishing T10 at the LPGA Final Qualifying Tournament.

Amateur wins
1996 Girls Amateur Championship
1999 The Womens Amateur Championship

Professional wins
2001 Lalla Meryem Cup

Results in LPGA majors

CUT = missed the half-way cut
"T" = tied

Team appearances
Amateur
European Ladies' Team Championship (representing France): 1999 (winners)
Vagliano Trophy (representing the Continent of Europe): 1999 (winners)
Espirito Santo Trophy (representing France): 1996, 1998

References

External links

French female golfers
Ladies European Tour golfers
LPGA Tour golfers
Winners of ladies' major amateur golf championships
Golfers from Paris
1978 births
Living people